Maurice Harold Winetrobe (July 6, 1922 – April 1, 2008) was an American film and music editor. He was nominated for an Academy Award in the category Best Film Editing for the film Funny Girl. Winetrobe died in April 2008 in Los Angeles, California, at the age of 85.

Selected filmography 
 Funny Girl (1968; co-nominated with Robert Swink and William Sands)

References

External links 

1922 births
2008 deaths
People from Chelsea, Massachusetts
American film editors